In My Mind 1997–2007 the Best of Bertine Zetlitz is greatest hits compilation by Norwegian singer-songwriter Bertine Zetlitz and was released on December 3, 2007. It comprises one CD of singles and two new songs and a second CD of remixes.

Track listing
CD 1

CD 2

Chart positions

References

Bertine Zetlitz albums
2007 greatest hits albums